Mount de Chantal Visitation Academy was a  private Catholic all-girls school in the city of Wheeling in the U.S. state of West Virginia.

History
It was founded in 1848 as the Wheeling Female Academy in downtown Wheeling and in 1865 moved to its final location and assumed its permanent name. While grades five through twelve were all female, Mount de Chantal's Montessori and Elementary schools were co-ed.   They were members of the Ohio Valley Athletic Conference.

The school building was built in 1864-1865.  The original structure was composed of three major parts connected by two recessed wings.  The building was constructed of brick, on a limestone foundation, with a slate covered gable roof.  A two-storied brick porch, added about 1910, extended the entire width.  The Fine Arts addition was built in 1906, the "laundry building" in 1908, and living quarters for the Sisters in 1972.

It was listed on the National Register of Historic Places in 1978. The school ceased operations on May 31, 2008 with the nuns being transferred to Georgetown Visitation in Washington D.C. Wheeling Hospital announced they were purchasing the building on April 13, 2010. No plans were announced and several historic societies were looking into preservation efforts but nothing was ever solidified. Demolition plans were announced and finalized in November 2011. Several items left behind by the nuns were auctioned off and razing efforts commenced on November 7, 2011.  No plans have been announced for the site, although the grounds are currently being used as practice fields for the local Catholic High Schools.

Notable Alumnae
Carrie Watson Fleming, First lady of West Virginia, 1890–1893
Edna Hall Scott Kump, First lady of West Virginia, 1933–1937
Judith Herndon, West Virginia state senator
Virginia B. Evans, artist
Oriska Worden, singer and vaudeville performer

See also
List of historic sites in Ohio County, West Virginia
List of Registered Historic Places in West Virginia

References
 
 

Visitation schools
Defunct Catholic secondary schools in the United States
Defunct schools in West Virginia
Demolished buildings and structures in West Virginia
Educational institutions disestablished in 2008
Educational institutions established in 1848
Former school buildings in the United States
Defunct girls' schools in the United States
School buildings completed in 1865
Schools in Ohio County, West Virginia
School buildings on the National Register of Historic Places in West Virginia
Victorian architecture in West Virginia
Buildings and structures in Wheeling, West Virginia
National Register of Historic Places in Wheeling, West Virginia
Roman Catholic Diocese of Wheeling-Charleston
1848 establishments in Virginia
1865 establishments in West Virginia
2008 disestablishments in West Virginia
Women in West Virginia